Western American English (also known as Western U.S. English) is a variety of American English that largely unites the entire Western United States as a single dialect region, including the states of California, Nevada, Arizona, Utah, New Mexico, Colorado, and Wyoming. It also generally encompasses Washington, Oregon, Idaho, and Montana, some of whose speakers are classified additionally under Pacific Northwest English.

The West was the last area in the United States to be reached during the gradual westward expansion of settlement by English speakers and its history shows considerable mixing and leveling of the linguistic patterns of other regions. Therefore, since the settlement populations are relatively young when compared with other regions, the American West continues to be a dialect region in formation. According to the 2006 Atlas of North American English, as a very broad generalization, Western U.S. accents are differentiated from Southern U.S. accents in maintaining  as a diphthong, from Northern U.S. accents by fronting  (the  vowel), and from both by most consistently showing the cot–caught merger. The standard Canadian accent also aligns to this definition, though it typically includes certain additional vowel differences.

Phonology and phonetics 

The Western regional accent of American English is somewhat variable and not necessarily distinct from "General American" or from the speech of younger or educated Americans nationwide. Western American English is defined primarily by two phonological features: the cot-caught merger (as distinct from most traditional Northern and Southern U.S. English) and the fronting of the  vowel but not the  vowel. This fronting is distinct from most Southern and Mid-Atlantic American English, in which both of those vowels are fronted, as well as from most Northern U.S. English, in which both of these remain backed. 

Linguists believe this may be the cause of, or at least related to, more and more Western speakers in general lowering or retracting the  vowel and the  vowel in a chain shift most intensely associated with California and led by young women. This shift, too, is documented in mainland Canadian English: the Canadian Shift. As in General American, the West is entirely rhotic and the Mary–marry–merry merger is complete, so that words like Mary, marry, and merry are all pronounced identically because of the merger of all three of those vowels' sounds when before r. 

Although it occurs at least occasionally nationwide, T-glottalization at word boundaries, as in "right ankle", is more common in Western dialects, particularly among younger speakers and women.

A trend evident particularly in some speakers from the Salt Lake City, Utah, and Flagstaff, Arizona, areas, as well as in some Californian and New Mexican English, is the completion of, or transition towards, a full–fool merger. This may be related to scatterings of Western speakers, such as some Utah speakers, generally producing lax pronunciations of the tense front vowels before , such as pronouncing "sale" as "sell"  or "milk" as "melk" . Southern twang-like monophthongization of  has been sporadically reported in the Southwest, for example in some speakers before  in southern Arizona and Utah. A significant minority of Western speakers have the pin–pen merger or a closeness to the merger, especially around Bakersfield, California, though it is a sound typically associated with Southern American English, which influenced Bakersfield settlers. Another recognizable though nonstandard trait particularly in California and the Pacific Northwest, is raising the short i  sound to an almost long ee  sound before ng so that their pronunciation of -ing with G-dropping, is shorter than the vowel of bean or the traditional British pronunciation of been .

Vocabulary 
baby buggy: baby carriage (more common east of the Mississippi River, mixed in the region between the Mississippi and Appalachian Mountains, rare east of the Appalachians)
bear claw: a large stuffy pastry
buckaroo: cowboy
Originating in California, buckaroo is an Anglicization of the Mexican Spanish translation of cowboy vaquero; the corresponding term which originated in Texas is "wrangler" or "horse wrangler", itself an Anglicization of the Mexican caballerango.
chippie: a woman of loose morals
coke predominates in eastern New Mexico; pop in the Northwest and Northern Mountain States; and soda in California and Arizona: sweet carbonated soft drink
firefly: any insect of the Lampyridae family, now widespread nationwide
frontage road: a service or access road
gunnysack: burlap bag (the latter more common east of the Mississippi)
hella: very (adverb), much, or many (adjective); originated in the San Francisco Bay Area and now used throughout Northern California
mud hen: the American coot
shivaree: a belling or serenade 
Shivaree is the more common usage east of the Mississippi and in Kentucky and Tennessee; "belling" is the more common usage in Ohio, while "serenade" is the more common usage in Atlantic states—except New York and Connecticut—and the Appalachians)

Sub-varieties 
Several sub-types of the Western dialect appear to be currently in formation, and the West, being an area of especially recent English-speaking settlement, shows relatively low homogeneity and internal consistency. Additionally, most Mexican-American English is spoken within, and arguably falls under the regional dialect of, the Western United States.

Alaska
Currently, there is not enough data on the English of Alaska to either include it within Western American English or assign it its own "separate status". Not far from Anchorage, in Alaska's Matanuska-Susitna Valley, is a distinctly Minnesota-like accent due to immigration of Minnesotans to the valley in the 1930s.

California

A noticeable California Vowel Shift has been observed in the English of some California speakers scattered throughout the state, though especially younger and coastal speakers. This shift involves two elements, including that the vowel in words like toe, rose, and go (though remaining back vowels elsewhere in the Western dialect), and the vowel in words like spoon, move, and rude are both pronounced farther forward in the mouth than most other English dialects; at the same time, a lowering chain movement of the front vowels is occurring (identical to the Canadian Vowel Shift), so that, to listeners of other English dialects, sit may approach the sound of set, set may approach sat, and sat may approach sot. This front-vowel lowering is also reported around Portland, Oregon, the hub of a unique Northwestern variety of American English that demonstrates other similarities with Canadian English.

Hawaii
Studies demonstrate that gender, age, and ability to speak Hawaiian Creole (a language locally called "Pidgin" and spoken by about two-fifths of Hawaii residents) correlate with the recent emergence of different Hawaiian English accents. Though this movement of these vowels is superficially similar to the California Vowel Shift, it is not believed to be due to a chain shift, though Hawaii residents do have a cot–caught merger, at least among younger speakers. Unlike most Americans, Hawaii residents may not demonstrate any form of /æ/ tensing (even before nasal consonants, as with most Western Americans).

New Mexico
In New Mexico, the state with the largest Hispanic population by percentage and no Anglo majority population, studies have distinguished the English of English-Spanish bilinguals versus (Anglo) English monolinguals.
However, this same shift failed to appear in a later study, in which Anglo New Mexicans (and particularly young women) were the ones more likely to engage in an innovative California-like vowel shift, whereas Hispanic speakers raised  before nasals significantly less, while pronouncing  higher and further back. Many New Mexicans, both Anglo-American and Hispanic, pronounce the cluster  in the word new. That is, they don't show yod-dropping after , unlike most Americans.
Aside from noting a possible full–fool merger regardless of ethnicity, New Mexican English research has tended to focus on vocabulary: particularly loanwords from New Mexican Spanish.
The word acequia  is used for a ditch; canales  for rain and street gutters; corazón  for sweetheart, darling, courage, or spirit; nana for one's grandmother (more widely than elsewhere in the U.S.); and vigas for rafters.
The New Mexican chile pepper has had such a large cultural impact that it has even been entered into the Congressional Record spelled as chile, not chili.

Pacific Northwest

The states of Oregon and Washington show a mixture of features that vary widely among the local speakers themselves. Overall, these features are strongly similar to both Californian as well as Canadian English. Studies are therefore inconclusive about whether this region constitutes a distinct dialect or not.

Utah
The English of Utah shows great variation, though little overall consistency, making it difficult to classify as either a sub-dialect of Western American English or a separate dialect of its own. Members of the LDS Church may use the propredicate "do" or "done", as in the sentence "I would have done", unlike other Americans, suggesting a more recent British influence within the Church. Utahns may use slightly distinct vowel placement and vowel space area during articulation, particularly with young, female speakers documented as pronouncing  as higher than —the opposite of a typical modern Western accent. Throughout the Mormon corridor beyond Utah, practicing Mormons tend to lag behind regional dialect changes while maintaining characteristic Utah features.

See also 
 Hawaiʻi Creole English popularly known as Pidgin 
 American Indian English or Native American English
 Chinook Jargon a local creole language once much more widely spoken
 Boontling a local English-based cant spoken in Boonville, California

References

External links 
California Vowels
Dr. Eckert's Interview About Northern California Speech

American English
Western United States